Learn to Sing Like a Star is Kristin Hersh's seventh solo album and was released in the US on Yep Roc Records on the 23 January 2007 and on 4AD for the rest of the world on the 29 January. The album was produced by Kristin herself and mixed in Nashville by two-time Grammy winner Trina Shoemaker. It features her Throwing Muses bandmate David Narcizo on drums and with strings by the McCarricks. The album peaked at #27 on the US's Billboard Top Heatseekers Album Chart.

Touring
In early 2007 Hersh toured throughout Europe and the US to promote the album, first solo in a series of instore performances and then with her 50 Foot Wave band mates Bernard Georges and Rob Ahlers as well as The McCarricks. In October 2007 she will do a short tour of Australia and New Zealand.

Critical reception
Learn to Sing Like a Star was met with "generally favorable reviews from critics. At Metacritic, which assigns a weighted average rating out of 100 to reviews from mainstream publications, this release received an average score of 74, based on 20 reviews. Aggregator Album of the Year gave the release a 75 out of 100 based on a critical consensus of 9 reviews.

Shawn Badgley of The Austin Chronicle said the album "has thehe full Hersh experience, encompassing as it does all of her back-catalog iterations, from the knife-throwing thrills of the Throwing Muses' precise power pop to the cutting melancholia of her Hips and Makers-era balladry. With help from Dave Narcizo on drums and Martin and Kimberlee McCarrick on cello and violin, Hersh handles everything else."

Track listing

Personnel

Musicians
 Kristin Hersh – primary artist, producer
 Kimberlee McCarrick – violin
 David Narcizo – drums
 Martin McCarrick – cello

Production
 Joe Gastwirt – engineer
 Steve Rizzo – engineer
 Mike Paragone – mixing

References

External links
 Official Kristin Hersh and Throwing muses site
 "LTSLAS at the artists online store"
 "LTSLAS at Yep Roc Records"
 "LTSLAS at 4AD"
 The McCarricks official site
 Lyrics

2007 albums
Kristin Hersh albums
4AD albums
Yep Roc Records albums